José Manuel López (born 6 December 2000) is an Argentine professional footballer who plays as a winger for Palmeiras.

Career
López started his career at the age of seven with Club El Progreso in Saladas. Six months later, soon before a trial in front of their scouts, the player was signed by Boca Juniors. At the age of nine, López joined Independiente; remaining until 2016, he notably trained with Ariel Holan's first-team squad at one point. 2017 saw López head to Lanús, initially featuring at youth level before being called up mid-season ahead of the 2018–19 Primera División resumption. However, in that period, López was loaned to Liga Tresarroyense side Colegiales de Tres Arroyos in 2019. He finished his stint there as the club's top scorer.

López was promoted into Luis Zubeldía's senior squad in late-2020, appearing on the substitute's bench for Copa de la Liga Profesional encounters with Aldosivi and Defensa y Justicia. López, in the aforementioned competition, made his professional debut on 3 January 2021 during a draw on the road against Patronato, after he was substituted on in place of Gonzalo Torres with twenty-five minutes left. On his second appearance, López scored his first goal during a win over Rosario Central on 9 January.

Career statistics
.

Notes

References

External links

2000 births
Living people
Sportspeople from Corrientes Province
Argentine footballers
Association football forwards
Argentine Primera División players
Club Atlético Lanús footballers
Sociedade Esportiva Palmeiras players